Equity Bank Uganda Limited (EBUL), is a commercial bank in Uganda. It is licensed by the Bank of Uganda, the central bank and national banking regulator. EBUL is a subsidiary of Equity Group Holdings Limited, a financial service conglomerate with headquarters in Kenya and subsidiaries in six countries of the African Great Lakes Region.

Location
The bank maintains its headquarters and main branch in Janani Luwum Church House, at 34 Kampala Road, in the central business district of Kampala, Uganda's capital and largest city. The geographical coordinates of the bank's headquarters are.

Overview
The bank provides banking services to individuals and to small and medium business enterprises. As of 31 December 2019, the bank's total assets were valued at UGX:1.63 trillion ($464.84 million). By 30 June 2020, the bank's total assets had grown to UGX1.823 trillion ($520 million). In December 2020, EBUL's total assets were valued at USh:2.069 trillion (US$590 million). At that time, it was the 7th largest commercial bank in Uganda by assets.

As of December 2021, total assets were valued at UGX:2.9 trillion (approx. US$745 million), with customer deposits of UGX:2.3 trillion (approx. US$597 million) and a loan book of UGX:1.5 trillion (approx. US$389.3 million).

At that time its share of customer deposits was estimated at 8 percent of national banking deposits. This made EBUL the fastest growing commercial bank in the country, having increased its market share of bank deposits in the country, from 1.75 percent in 2011. As of 2021, EBUL was the 6th largest bank in Uganda compared to 15th position it was in 2011.

History
Equity Bank Uganda Limited was created in 2008 when the Equity Group Holdings Limited purchased Uganda Microfinance Limited, a Tier II, Ugandan microfinance company for an all-share price of US$27 million. Equity Bank (Uganda) launched under its new brand on 30 March 2009.

Ownership
Equity Bank Uganda Limited is a subsidiary of Equity Group Holdings Limited (EGHL). The Ugandan subsidiary owns 11,333,333 ordinary shares of the parent company based in Nairobi, Kenya. EGHL is a large Kenyan financial services conglomerate, with total assets of over Kshs 1.12 trillion (US$10.4 billion), as at July 2021. The stock of EGHL is also cross-listed on the Uganda Securities Exchange under the symbol EBL.

Branch network 
Equity Bank Uganda Limited has its headquarters in Uganda's capital city, Kampala. , the bank maintained networked branches at the following locations:

See also

 List of banks in Uganda
 Banking in Uganda

References

External links
  Bank of Uganda Website
  Equity Bank (Uganda) Homepage
 Equity Bank bets big on Uganda subsidiary for profit growth As of 1 November 2017.

 

Banks of Uganda
Banks established in 2008
2008 establishments in Uganda
Companies based in Kampala